Throughout their history, the Belgium national team have played at 24 home locations in 12 urban areas, most often in the country's Capital Region, Brussels. The national King Baudouin Stadium, with a capacity of 50,024 people, is the usual playing ground nowadays. At this location, the majority of the Red Devils' home matches took place. Other stadiums (with a smaller capacity) are normally assigned as home ground in case a rather small audience is to be expected or when the national stadium is in repair.

History

Belgium's first official match in 1904 was a home game, at the Stade du Vivier d'Oie in Uccle. Before their first official match in the national Jubilee Stadium in Brussels in 1931, the Red Devils made 67 home appearances in the current urban areas of Antwerp, Brussels, Liège, Seraing and Verviers. In that era, Antwerp and its surroundings often hosted the Belgian home matches (32 times), mostly explained by the frequent confrontations against the national team of Antwerp's neighbouring country Netherlands, and the 1920 Olympics football tournament held at the Olympisch Stadion (the "Kiel").

From 1931 on, the large majority of the home games have been played in the stadium at the Heysel plain in Brussels. Inaugurated as "Jubilee Stadium" in 1930 with an unofficial match against Netherlands, and renamed "Heysel Stadium" in 1946, it underwent a drastical transformation in 1995. From then on, the stadium was named after the late King Baudouin I. Also over the totality of home games since 1904, the location of the current King Baudouin Stadium accounts for the majority of home games played. In May 2013, it was announced that the King Baudouin Stadium would be demolished to create place for housing and that a new stadium would arise nearby at the Heysel. In December of that year the involved parties agreed that this new stadium would no longer contain an athletic track as is currently the case. However, the plans for the new stadium were shelved when no building permit for it was awarded.

Some Belgian home stadiums have served as background for major tournaments when they hosted the 1920 Olympics (including its football tournament) and the 1972 and 2000 European Championships. In September 2014 Brussels was assigned as one of the 13 host cities for the 2020 European Championship, with an upcoming new stadium ("Eurostadium") as venue for four tournament matches. However, the UEFA later awarded the games to the Wembley Stadium when delays were causing uncertainty whether the new stadium in Brussels would be completed in time.

List of home stadiums

Some stadiums were given different names at different times; only the official name at the last time the national team played is mentioned below. Statistics include official FIFA-recognised matches only; unofficial games can be found here.

*"Brussels" does not refer to the City of Brussels, but the entire Brussels Capital Region. The towns between brackets are independent municipalities within this region.

Notes

References

Stadium
Belgium
Belgium, international
Lists of buildings and structures in Belgium
Stadium